Kate Eurwen O'Toole (born 26 February 1960) is an English actress. She is the daughter of British actor Peter O'Toole and actress Siân Phillips.

Early life and education
O'Toole was born on 26 February 1960 in Stratford-upon-Avon, Warwickshire, England. She is the daughter of actors Peter O'Toole and Siân Phillips.

Filmography
Minister for Arts, Culture, Heritage and the Gaeltacht, Jimmy Deenihan, appointed her to the Irish Film Board in 2013. She is chairwoman of Ireland's highly acclaimed film festival, the Galway Film Fleadh.

Personal life
She was named after American actress Katharine Hepburn, whom her father admired and would later work with in The Lion in Winter.

In November 2008, O'Toole was convicted of driving while drunk and disqualified from driving for three years. Her blood sample showed that she was three times over the legal drink-drive limit.

References

External links
 

1960 births
Living people
20th-century English actresses
21st-century English actresses
Actresses from Warwickshire
Circle in the Square Theatre School alumni
English people of Irish descent
English people of Scottish descent
English people of Welsh descent
People educated at North London Collegiate School
People from Stratford-upon-Avon
Yale School of Drama alumni